The 2019 WPA Women's World Nine-ball Championship was a professional nine-ball pool tournament that took place at Jinghai International Holiday Hotel & Resort in Sanya, China from 16 to 19 December 2019.

Kelly Fisher won the title with a 9–7 victory over Jasmin Ouschan in the final, remaining undefeated in seven matches during the tournament. It was Fisher's second Women's World Nine-ball Championship win, following her first in 2012.

Format
The 64 players who had been qualified for the Women's World Nine-Ball Championship were divided in 8 groups (each group had 8 players). In the group stage, the double elimination was played and all matches were race to 7. From each group four players qualified for the final round (Last 32).

Prize fund
The prize money for the event is shown below.

Knockout draw
The results for the knockout stage (Last 16) is shown below.

Final 
The final was played between two European players - Kelly Fisher (England) and Jasmin Ouschan (Austria). Alternate break format was played. Both player have only two break-and-run, Kelly Fisher in the racks no. 6 and 10, Jasmin Ouschan in the racks no. 13 and 15.

References 

WPA World Nine-ball Championship
Women's world championships
2019 in Chinese women's sport